Traveller Personal Data Files is a 1981 role-playing game supplement published by Games Workshop for Traveller.

Contents
Traveller Personal Data Files consists of a pad of 50 character sheets, each containing spaces for skills, psionics, equipment, and other notes.

Reception
William A. Barton reviewed Traveller Personal Data Files in The Space Gamer No. 48. Barton commented that "Overall, if you can locate this import item, you should find it quite useful."

References

Character sheets
Role-playing game supplements introduced in 1981
Traveller (role-playing game) supplements